Michelle Lee is an American actress, martial artist, and stuntwoman. Since the early 2000s, Lee has provided stunt work and motion capture for dozens of films, television series and video games, and also portrayed the roles of Ada Wong in Resident Evil 6 and Mileena in the second season of Mortal Kombat: Legacy.

Selected roles

Film

Television

Video games

Various roles: Medal of Honor: Underground (2000), Law & Order: Dead on the Money (2002), Law & Order II: Double or Nothing (2003), Law & Order: Justice is Served (2004), Law & Order: Criminal Intent (2005), Gears of War (2006), Super Street Fighter II Turbo HD Remix (2008), Resistance: Retribution (2009), Call of Duty: Black Ops (2010), Blur (2010), X-Men: Destiny (2011), Sleeping Dogs (2012), Call of Duty: Black Ops II (2012).

Miscellaneous
TV show Next Action Star (2004) - herself
Snapdragon commercial (2012) - Mage

Awards and recognition
In 2006, Lee was nominated in the category "Female Action Performer of the Year" at the Action On Film International Film Festival for her role of a ninja in the short film Girl with Gun. In 2007, she, along with the others stunt performers in Pirates of the Caribbean: At World's End, was nominated in Screen Actors Guild Awards for "Outstanding Performance by a Stunt Ensemble in a Motion Picture". In 2010, she was featured on the cover of Inside Kung Fu.

References

External links

Michelle Lee at MobyGames

American film actresses
American people of Chinese descent
American stunt performers
American television actresses
American video game actresses
American wushu practitioners
Living people
21st-century American actresses
Year of birth missing (living people)